Lancaster is a town in Worcester County, Massachusetts, in the United States. Incorporated in 1653, Lancaster is the oldest town in Worcester County. As of the 2020 census, the town population was 8,441.

History 

In 1643 Lancaster was first settled as "Nashaway" (named after the local Nashaway Native American tribe) by a group of colonists known as the Nashaway Company who may have initially been interested in iron deposits in the area.  Several of the company were blacksmiths or gunsmiths, including, Herman Garrett, and as early as 1653 a settler, George Adams, was whipped for selling guns and alcohol to the Indians in the area. The town was officially incorporated and renamed "Lancaster on the Nashua" in 1653. Prominent Massachusetts military leader Simon Willard served as an advisor to the company and eventually settled in Lancaster for a period, and provided guns to the local tribe by order of the Massachusetts General Court.

Supporters of Lancaster's founder, John Prescott, born in 1604 (great grandfather of Bunker Hill leader William Prescott), wished to name the new settlement Prescott, but the Massachusetts General Court considered such a request from a common freeman presumptuous, given that at that time, not even a governor had held the honor of naming a town after himself. Instead, they decided to use Lancaster, the name of Prescott's home town in England.

Until it was cut down in 1989 due to safety concerns, Lancaster boasted the largest oak tree in the state, called the Beaman Oak, named after settler Gamaliel Beaman (1623–1677).

Lancaster boasts being the official "mothertown" to all of Eastern central Massachusetts. Towns such as Harvard, Bolton, Leominster, Clinton, Berlin, Sterling, and part of West Boylston were all formed from territory of the original boundaries of Lancaster.

Lancaster was the site of the Mary Rowlandson (–1711) attack (Lancaster raid) in February 1676 (1675 old style calendar). During Metacom's War, which was fought partially in Lancaster, a group of Native Americans pillaged the entire town of Lancaster. Their last stop was Mary Rowlandson's house. Coming to the defense of the house was Rowlandson's brother-in-law, who was immediately shot and killed by the attacking Native Americans. The Native Americans then set fire to the house, forcing Rowlandson to exit the burning building. Upon crossing the doorstep, Rowlandson saw a scene full of carnage. The majority of her household was slaughtered, with the exception of her husband, Joseph Rowlandson Sr., who was not on the premises, their son, also called Joseph, their two daughters, Mary and Sarah, and herself. Mary, her son, and her two daughters were captured by the Native Americans and forced to join their travels across New England. The Native Americans non-fatally shot Mary Rowlandson in her side, but her youngest daughter, Sarah, sustained an injury during the attack that would later bring about her death. After her release from captivity, Rowlandson wrote a book called A Narrative of the Captivity and Restoration of Mrs. Mary Rowlandson. In 2000, Lancaster Elementary School changed its name to Mary Rowlandson Elementary School.

Geography

Lancaster is bordered by Lunenburg and Shirley to the north, Harvard to the northeast, Bolton to the southeast, Clinton to the south, Sterling to the southwest, and Leominster to the northwest.

Demographics

As of the census of 2010, there were 8,055 people, 2,409 households, and 1,758 families residing in the town. The racial makeup of the town was 86.4% White, 7.7% African American, 0.1% Native American, 1.7% Asian, 2.5% from other races, and 1.6% from two or more races. Hispanic or Latino of any race were 8.1% of the population.

There were 2,409 households, out of which 31.6% had children under the age of 18 living with them, 60.2% were married couples living together, 3.8% had a male householder with no wife present, 9.0% had a female householder with no husband present, and 27.0% were non-families. Of all households 21.8% had a householder that lived alone and 8.4% had a householder that lived alone who was 65 years of age or older. The average household size was 2.66 and the average family size was 3.13.

In the town, the population was spread out, with 23.6% at the age of 19 or under, 7.9% from 20 to 24, 27.5% from 25 to 44, 29.1% from 45 to 64, and 11.8% who were 65 years of age or older. The median age was 38.9 years. For every 100 females, there were 128.9 males. For every 100 females age 18 and over, there were 131.0 males.

As of the 2015 American Community Survey, the median income for a household in the town was $96,813, and the median income for a family was $99,207. Males had a median income of $62,500 versus $45,174 for females. The per capita income for the town was $32,899. About 8.3% of families and 9.2% of the population were below the poverty line, including 17.1% of those under age 18 and 1.7% of those age 65 or over.

Government

Education
Lancaster is served by the Nashoba Regional School District. It is also the site of the former Atlantic Union College and of South Lancaster Academy, incorporated in 1882–1883. The Dr. Franklin Perkins School is a private special education school located in the town. Trivium School, founded in 1979, is a private Catholic college preparatory school occupying the former estate of E. V. R. Thayer Jr.

Library

Lancaster's public Thayer Memorial Library first opened in 1868. In fiscal year 2008, the town of Lancaster spent 1.74% ($259,465) of its budget on its public library—approximately $36 per person, per year.

Notable people

 Herman Vandenburg Ames, dean of the University of Pennsylvania graduate school
 James Atherton, pioneer and the namesake of Atherton Bridge
 Frank Bancroft, Baseball manager
 Luther Burbank, botanist, horticulturist and a pioneer in agricultural science
 Ezra Butler, United States Representative from Vermont
 James C. Carter, New York City lawyer
 Charles F. Chandler, chemist
 Horace Cleveland, landscape architect
 Francis B. Fay, merchant and politician
 Hannah Flagg Gould, poet
 Timothy Harrington, Lancaster clergyman
 Abraham Haskell, physician
 Stephen N. Haskell, clergyman and pioneering leader of the Seventh-day Adventist denomination, founded South Lancaster Academy
 Caroline Lee Hentz, novelist
 Henrietta Swan Leavitt, astronomer who discovered the relation between the luminosity and the period of Cepheid variable stars
 Charles W. Moors, Wisconsin politician
 Herbert Parker (Massachusetts politician), Republican politician, Massachusetts Attorney General from 1902–1906
 John Prescott, pioneer, founder of Lancaster
 Mary Rowlandson, colonial Indian captive and author of one of America's first best selling books
 Jared Sparks, historian, Harvard University president (taught at a private school in Lancaster 1815–1817)
 John Thayer, ornithologist
 Nathaniel Thayer, Unitarian congregational minister
 Nathaniel Thayer (Jr.), financier and philanthropist
 John Whitcomb, soldier in the Continental Army
 Henry Whiting, soldier in the War of 1812 and the Mexican–American War
 Abijah Willard, Loyalist soldier in the American Revolution
 Dr. Samuel Willard, representative to the Massachusetts ratification of the United States Constitution

References

External links

 Town of Lancaster official website
 Lancaster Online, community website
 Annals of Lancaster: The Massacre of February 10, 1676
 Information about early education in Lancaster
 Lancaster 2007 Master Plan maps and tables
 

 
1653 establishments in Massachusetts
Populated places established in 1653
Towns in Worcester County, Massachusetts